Group 3 may refer to:

Group 3 element, chemical element classification 
Group 3 (racing), FIA classification for auto racing
Group 3, the third tier of races in worldwide Thoroughbred horse racing
 Group 3 image format, Group 3 & Group 4 are digital technical standard for compressing and sending faxes
Group 3 Rugby League, a rugby competition in Australia
Group 3 Films, a British film production organisation funded by the National Film Finance Corporation

See also

 C group (disambiguation)
 Group C (disambiguation)
 Group (disambiguation)
 3 (disambiguation)